Joshua Stephen Outman (born September 14, 1984) is an American former professional baseball pitcher. He pitched in Major League Baseball (MLB) for the Oakland Athletics (2008-2009, 2011), Colorado Rockies (2012-2013), Cleveland Indians (2014), and New York Yankees (2014).

Early life
Outman graduated from Lindbergh High School and then pitched for Forest Park Community College in Saint Louis before transferring to the Central Missouri State. While playing for the Mules, he posted a 10-2 record and helped the Mules finish third in the NCAA Division II World Series. Outman was one of five Mules drafted in the 2005 MLB Draft.

Career

Philadelphia Phillies

Oakland Athletics
On July 17, 2008, Outman was traded, along with fellow prospects Adrian Cardenas and Matthew Spencer, to the Oakland Athletics for starting pitcher Joe Blanton.

Outman was called up to the majors for the first time on September 2, and pitched two scoreless innings that night against the Kansas City Royals, striking out two. Outman's performance in the 2009 season gave him the fan nickname "Out-Man", because of his ability to get the easy outs . Outman's brother, Zachary, was selected by the Toronto Blue Jays, in the 28th round of the 2009 Major League Baseball Draft, out of Saint Louis University.

After a successful first half of the 2009 season starting 12 games for the Athletics. Outman was placed on the disabled list with an injury to his pitching elbow. Outman underwent Tommy John surgery, ending his season on June 30.

Outman, recovering from surgery, missed the entire 2010 season.

In 2011, Outman pitched 58.1 innings (starting 9 games), with a 3–5 record, 35 strikeouts and 3.70 ERA.

Colorado Rockies

On January 16, 2012, Outman, along with pitcher Guillermo Moscoso, was traded to the Colorado Rockies for outfielder Seth Smith.

Cleveland Indians
Outman was traded to the Cleveland Indians on December 18, 2013 in exchange for outfielder Drew Stubbs.

On January 14, 2014, Outman avoided arbitration after filing for arbitration earlier that morning. He was the first player to avoid arbitration in 2014. Cots Contracts reported that he had signed a 1 year/$1.25M contract.

On June 18, 2014, the Indians designated Outman for assignment and was outrighted on June 25.

New York Yankees
Josh Outman was acquired by the New York Yankees on August 28, 2014 in exchange for a player to be named later or cash considerations. He was designated for assignment on September 22, 2014. Outman elected free agency September 30, 2014.

Atlanta Braves
Outman signed a one-year contract with the Atlanta Braves on January 7, 2015. He was released on August 4, 2015.

New Britain Bees
On April 7, 2016, Outman signed with the New Britain Bees of the Atlantic League of Professional Baseball.

Pittsburgh Pirates
On July 9, 2016, Outman signed a minor league deal with the Pittsburgh Pirates. He was released by the Pirates on August 13, 2016.

Washington Nationals
On December 31, 2016, Outman signed a minor league contract with the Washington Nationals. He was released on May 2, 2017.

Acereros de Monclova
On May 28, 2017, Outman signed with the Acereros de Monclova of the Mexican Baseball League.

Pericos de Puebla
He was traded to the Pericos de Puebla on June 24, 2017.

Rieleros de Aguascalientes
On November 11, 2017, he was traded to the Rieleros de Aguascalientes along with Andres Ivan Meza, Julio Felix, and Ramon Delgado. He was released prior to the 2018 season.

New Britain Bees (second stint)
On June 1, 2018, Outman signed with the New Britain Bees of the Atlantic League of Professional Baseball.

Pericos de Puebla (second stint)
On August 16, 2018, Outman's contract was purchased by the Pericos de Puebla of the Mexican League. He became a free agent following the season.

Piratas de Campeche
On May 15, 2019, Outman signed with the Piratas de Campeche of the Mexican League. He was released on July 16, 2019.

Pitching style
Outman throws five pitches, relying most heavily on a four-seam fastball at 93–96 mph. He also throws a two-seamer (90–95), a slider (80–83), a changeup (78–83), and a curveball (low-to-mid 70s). His changeup is not thrown to left-handed hitters, but is a common pitch against right-handers. He uses his slider a great deal against lefties but typically uses it against righties only in 2-strike counts. Throughout his career, the slider has been his best swing-and-miss pitch, with a whiff rate of 46% through June 2012.

References

External links

1984 births
Living people
Acereros de Monclova players
American expatriate baseball players in Mexico
Baseball players from St. Louis
Batavia Muckdogs players
Carolina Mudcats players
Central Missouri Mules baseball players
Clearwater Threshers players
Cleveland Indians players
Colorado Rockies players
Colorado Springs Sky Sox players
Columbus Clippers players
Gulf Coast Braves players
Indianapolis Indians players
Lakewood BlueClaws players
Major League Baseball pitchers
Mayos de Navojoa players
Mexican League baseball pitchers
Midland RockHounds players
Mississippi Braves players
Modesto Nuts players
Naranjeros de Hermosillo players
New Britain Bees players
New York Yankees players
Oakland Athletics players
Peoria Saguaros players
Pericos de Puebla players
Piratas de Campeche players
Reading Phillies players
Rome Braves players
Sacramento River Cats players
Sugar Land Skeeters players
Team USA players
Tigres del Licey players
American expatriate baseball players in the Dominican Republic
Toros del Este players
Tulsa Drillers players
STLCC Archers baseball players